, son of Nijō Haruyoshi and adopted son of regent Tanemichi, was a kugyō or Japanese court noble of the Azuchi-Momoyama (1568–1603) and Edo periods (1603–1868). He held a regent position kampaku from 1578 to 1581 and from 1600 to 1604. Yukiie was his son.

Family
Father: Nijō Haruyoshi
Foster father: Kujō Tanemichi
Mother: Fushimi-no-miya-Iko
Wife: Takakura Hiroko
Children (all by Takakura Hiroko):
 Kujō Yukiie
 son (増孝, 1569-1644）
 daughter married Prince Hachijō Toshihito

References

 

1553 births
1636 deaths
Fujiwara clan
Kujō family